The Stateline Wind Farm is a wind farm located on Vansycle Ridge, which receives 16 to 18 mph (26 – 29 km/h) average wind speeds from the Columbia Gorge, on the border between Washington and Oregon in the United States.  With 454 turbines, it is the largest wind project in the Northwestern United States. Costing $300 million to build, it began operation in 2001.

The project employs 660 kW capacity Vestas wind turbines, which collectively will produce a maximum electrical output of 306.9 MW. On average, the project is expected to produce 30 to 35 percent of that capacity year-round. Turbines are controlled individually by electronic systems which direct them into the wind and adjust the pitch of the blades to maximize electrical production at any wind speed from 7 to 56 mph (11.3 to 90 km/h).

The wind turbines are grouped in strings of 5 to 37 turbines, each turbine spaced approximately 250 feet (76 m) from the next, generally slightly downwind of the crest of ridges. Each turbine tower is 166 feet (50 m) tall, with blades 76 feet (23 m) wide.

Environmental impact studies determined that the site was not used extensively by birds or other species vulnerable to injury from turbines, and the turbine towers' construction, along with the use of underground power lines, was designed to minimize perching places for birds. The area around the project is used primarily for private farming, including dryland wheat farming and cattle grazing.

The Stateline Wind Project is several miles northwest of the Vansycle Wind Project in Umatilla County, Oregon. Both are owned and operated by Florida Power & Light, a division of NextEra Energy.

A wind turbine collapsed over the weekend of November 2, 2013 on the Washington side of the Stateline Wind Project.

Gallery

See also

Bonneville Environmental Foundation
Wind power in the United States

References

External links
 Renewable Northwest Project site.
 Oregon government site.

Buildings and structures in Umatilla County, Oregon
Buildings and structures in Walla Walla County, Washington
Wind farms in Oregon
Wind farms in Washington (state)
Energy infrastructure completed in 2001
Energy infrastructure completed in 2002
Energy infrastructure completed in 2009
2001 establishments in Oregon
2001 establishments in Washington (state)
NextEra Energy